Luiza is a feminine given name, most commonly found in the Albanian, Polish, Portuguese, Romanian and Russian languages. People bearing the name Luiza include:

Luiza Almeida (born 1991), Brazilian dressage rider
Luiza Helena de Bairros (1953–2016), Brazilian administrator and sociologist
Luiza Bialasiewicz (born 1971), Polish-Italian political geographer
Luíza Brunet (born 1962), Brazilian model
Luiza Campos (born 1990), Brazilian rugby sevens player 
Luíza Curvo (born 1985), Brazilian actress
Luiza Erundina (born 1934), Brazilian politician 
Luiza Galiulina (born 1992), Uzbek gymnast
Luiza Ganieva (born 1995), Uzbek rhythmic gymnast
Luiza Gega (born 1988), Albanian middle-distance runner
Luiza Mariani (born 1980), Brazilian actress and producer
Luiza Melencu (2000–2019), Romanian murder victim
Luiza Noskova (born 1968), Russian biathlete 
Luiza Possi (born 1984), Brazilian pop singer
Luiza Prado (born 1988), Brazilian transdisciplinary artist
Luiza Sá (born 1983), Brazilian guitar player (Cansei de Ser Sexy)
Luiza Saidiyeva (born 1994), Kazakh archer
Luiza Savage (born 19??), Canadian journalist and editor 
Luíza Tomé (born 1961), Brazilian actress
Luiza Złotkowska (born 1986), Polish speed skater 
Luiza Zavloschi (1883-1967), Romanian politician

See also
Luisa

Albanian feminine given names
Polish feminine given names
Portuguese feminine given names
Romanian feminine given names
Russian feminine given names